The Bowen Island Undercurrent is a newspaper in Bowen Island, British Columbia published weekly.

The paper began in 1975 as essentially a newsletter for the island. It was born of a dispute between The Times of North and West Vancouver and columnist Pat Weaver. Weaver created her own paper after a disagreement with the GVRD director of the day and called it her "free speech project." After 12 editions, Weaver left on vacation and never returned to the island, leaving Larry Reid as editor and publisher for the next 13 years. The paper incorporated in 1977 and by 1981 was up to 40 legal-sized pages and a circulation of 800. That same year the paper moved from its stapled mimeograph format to being a tabloid, which it remains to this day. In 1988, Reid sold the paper to Eric Cardwell, owner of the Westender and the East Ender newspapers. In 1997 Black Press bought the paper and in 2013 Glacier Media acquired the Undercurrent in a paper swap.

The Undercurrent publishes every Thursday on Bowen Island.

See also
List of newspapers in Canada

References

External links

Glacier Media
Bowen Island
Publications with year of establishment missing
Weekly newspapers published in British Columbia